Mathilde Willink née Maria Theodora Mathilde de Doelder (7 July 1938, Terneuzen – 25 October 1977, Amsterdam) was an Amsterdam society figure and fashion icon, married to Dutch painter Carel Willink (1900–1983) from 1969 to 1977. She often wore Fong Leng's extravagant designs. The Willinks' eccentric relationship made them a staple in the Dutch gossip columns of the time. Four months after she divorced Carel, Mathilde was found dead in her bed. The details of her death remain unclear.

References

Biographies

At least six biographies have been written:
 Joop van Loon Mathilde of de bekentenissen van een Zeeuws meisje (Baarn 1977)  
  Zeeuws meisje (In De Groene Amsterdammer, 2 July 1997)
 Joop van Loon Mathilde Willink (1997) 
 Tomas Ross Mathilde (2003) 
 Marjolein Houweling Andermans Ogen (2010) 
 Lisette de Zoete, Mathilde: muze, mythe, mysterie, (2016) 

1938 births
1977 deaths
20th-century Dutch people
People from Terneuzen